The 2004 FIBA Europe Under-16 Championship for Women Division B was the first edition of the Division B of the European basketball championship for women's national under-16 teams. 17 teams were drawn into two groups. Group A tournament was played in Brčko, Bosnia and Herzegovina, from 30 July to 6 August 2004 and Group B tournament was played in Rakvere, Estonia, from 30 July to 8 August 2004. Ukraine and Lithuania won the tournaments and were promoted to the 2005 FIBA Europe Under-16 Championship for Women Division A.

Participating teams

Group A

Group B

Group A tournament

Final standings

Results

Group B tournament

Final standings

Results

References

2004
2004–05 in European women's basketball
International youth basketball competitions hosted by Bosnia and Herzegovina
International youth basketball competitions hosted by Estonia
FIBA U16
2004 in Bosnia and Herzegovina sport
2004 in Estonian sport
August 2004 sports events in Europe